Davol Mills is a historic textile mill complex located at the corner of Plymouth Avenue and Rodman Street in Fall River, Massachusetts. It was built in 1867 and expanded in 1871. It was added to the National Register of Historic Places in 1983 as part of the Corky Row Historic District The red brick mills are unique in the city, built in the Second Empire style.

History
The Davol Mills Company was organized in 1866, with nineteen persons, with initial capital set at $270,000, and named in honor of William C. Davol, a machinery builder who is credited with importing the Roberts Self-acting Mule from Great Britain to Fall River in the early 1840s. Mill No. 1 was built in 1867 at the corner of Rodman Street and Eight Rod Way (now known as Plymouth Avenue). The machinery was in operation by March 1868. The Davol Mills initially produced cotton shirtings, sheetings, silesias and fancy fabrics.

In 1871, Mill No. 2 was built along Hartwell Street, connected to the first mill. By 1917, the Davol Mills contained 44,000 spindles and 1,258 looms. The company acquired the nearby Tecumseh Mills in 1924. It shut down in 1935.

The site was recorded as part of the 1968 New England Textile Mills II, and photographed by Jack E. Boucher of the Historic American Buildings Survey.

See also
List of mills in Fall River, Massachusetts
National Register of Historic Places listings in Fall River, Massachusetts

References

External links
Historic American Buildings Survey - Davol Mills
Davol Mills, Fall River, Mass. - NYPL

Textile mills in Fall River, Massachusetts
Industrial buildings and structures on the National Register of Historic Places in Massachusetts
Historic district contributing properties in Massachusetts
Buildings and structures completed in 1867
Cotton mills in the United States
National Register of Historic Places in Fall River, Massachusetts